The 1985–86 Pepperdine Waves men's basketball team represented Pepperdine University in the 1985–86 NCAA Division I men's basketball season. The team was led by head coach Jim Harrick. The Waves played their home games at the Firestone Fieldhouse and were members of the West Coast Athletic Conference. They finished the season 25–5, 13–1 in WCAC play to win the regular season conference title by a 2-game margin to receive an automatic bid to the NCAA tournament. In the opening round, the Waves fell to No. 5 seed Maryland, 69–64.

Roster

Schedule and results

|-
!colspan=9 style=| Non-Conference Regular Season

|-
!colspan=9 style=| WCAC Regular Season

|-
!colspan=9 style=| NCAA Tournament

Source

Awards and honors
Dwayne Polee – WCAC Player of the Year (2x)
Jim Harrick – WCAC Coach of the Year

References

Pepperdine Waves men's basketball seasons
Pepperdine
Pepperdine
Pepperdine Waves Men's Basketball
Pepperdine Waves Men's Basketball